Fate is a generic role-playing game system based on the Fudge gaming system. It has no fixed setting, traits, or genre and is customizable. It is designed to offer minimal obstruction to role-playing by assuming players want to make fewer dice rolls.

Fate was written by Fred Hicks and Rob Donoghue; the 1st edition was published in early 2003, and the latest version (4th edition) was published successfully through crowd sourcing Kickstarter in 2013.

System

Fate is derived from the Fudge system, primarily that earlier design's verbal scale and Fudge dice, but most versions of Fate eschew the use of mandatory traits such as Strength and Intelligence. Instead, it uses a long list of skills and assumes that every character is "mediocre" in all skills except those that the character is explicitly defined as being good at. Skills may perform one or more of the four actions: attacking, defending, overcoming obstacles (a catch-all for solving problems) or creating an advantage (see below). Exceptional abilities are defined through the use of Stunts and Aspects.

An aspect is a free form descriptor of something notable about either the character or the scene. A relevant aspect can be invoked to grant a bonus to a die roll (either adding +2, or allowed a re-roll of the dice); this usually costs the player or GM a fate point. Aspects may also be compelled to influence the setting by offering the person with the aspect a fate point (which they can refuse by spending one of their own) to put them at a disadvantage relevant to the aspect. An example given in the rule book refers to the GM invoking a player character's Rivals in the Collegia Arcana aspect to have said rivals attack them in the bath so they don't have access to their equipment. Situational aspects describe the scene, and may be created and used by the GM, or by players using the create advantage action with a relevant skill.

Stunts are exceptional abilities that grant the character a specific mechanical benefit; these may be drawn from a pre-defined list of stunts included in the rules, or created following guidelines provided by the authors. Aspects, on the other hand, are always defined by the player. For example, a player may choose to give their character an aspect of "Brawny" (or "Muscle Man" or "Wiry Strength"); during play, the player may invoke those aspects to gain a temporary bonus in a relevant situation. Aspects may also relate to a character's possessions, e.g., the character Indiana Jones for example, might have the Aspect "Whip and Fedora".

Publication history and versions

FATE versus Fate (naming conventions)
When the system was originally published FATE was considered an acronym for "Fudge Adventures in Tabletop Entertainment", then for 2nd edition, "Fantastic Adventures in Tabletop Entertainment". Most recently FATE has been simplified to just be Fate and is no longer an acronym.

Fate OGL resources
While there has been concern that Fudge would restrict its "open" license and thus force Fate to change to a different underlying mechanic, such fears have subsided once Fudge itself was released under the Open Gaming License. Fate has an associated Yahoo! Group to discuss the gaming system and share settings and conversions of other role-playing games.

Fate 3rd Edition 
The 3rd edition of Fate was no longer a generic RPG like the first two versions, but set in the pulp genre. It is called Spirit of the Century and was nominated in 2007 for an ENnie award for Best Rules. The 3rd edition rules also are used for the Dresden Files role-playing game. The System Reference Documents for Spirit of the Century and Diaspora are also currently available. Several other role-playing games are built on the game mechanics of Fate 3.0.

Fate Core (4th edition) and Fate Accelerated Edition (FAE)
A new (4th) edition called Fate Core (again a generic version) was published in 2013, funded by a successful crowdfunding campaign, and released under two free content licenses: CC BY 3.0 and the Open gaming license. To release the new version of Fate, Evil Hat Productions ran a Kickstarter campaign that initially asked for $3,000. At the end of the campaign they raised $433,365 and expanded the product line significantly, adding two world books and a system toolkit.

As a result of another crowd funding effort, Evil Hat Productions released Fate Accelerated, a streamlined version of the rules based on the same core mechanic intended to get players into the game faster. One notable difference is that skills are replaced with six "approaches" to solving problems - Careful, Clever, Flashy, Forceful, Quick, and Sneaky. The approaches can each use all four skill actions.

Notable RPGs based on Fate 
This list includes implementations of the Fate system as well as RPGs explicitly inspired by it.
 Age of Arthur
 Atomic Robo
 Dawning Star: Fate of Eos
 Diaspora (hard science fiction)
 The Dresden Files (pulp storytelling set against a hidden magical modern world)
 Fate of Cthulhu
 Houses of the Blooded
 Jadepunk: Tales From Kausao City
 Legends of Anglerre
 Spirit of the Century
 Starblazer Adventures (based on the Starblazer comics series under license from DC Thomson)

Awards
In the 2003 Indie RPG Awards, Fate won a number of awards:

 First Place - Best Free Game of the Year
 First Place - Best Support
 Third Place - Indie RPG of the Year
 Recipient - Andy's Choice Award

The Fate roleplaying game has resulted in winning the following ENNIES awards:
 2007 
 Best Rules, Silver Winner
 Best Game, Honorable Mention — Spirit of the Century
 2008 
 Nominated for Best Supplement — Spirit of the Season
 2011 
 Best Game, Gold Winner
 Best New Game, Gold Winner
 Best Production Values, Silver Winner 
 Best Rules, Gold Winner 
 Best Writing, Gold Winner 
 Product of the Year, Silver Winner — Dresden Files Roleplaying Game
 2014 
 Best Website, Silver Winner for Fate SRD 
 Best Aid/Accessory, Silver Winner for Eldritch Fate Dice 
 Best Family Game, Gold Winner for Fate Accelerated Edition 
 Best Game, Gold Winner for Fate Core System 
 Best RPG Related Product, Silver Winner for Strange Tales of the Century 
 Best Rules, Gold Winner for Fate Core System 
 Best Supplement, Silver Winner for Fate System Toolkit 
 Product of the Year, Silver Winner for Fate Core System
 2015 
 Best Family Game, Silver Winner for  Atomic Robo The Roleplaying Game

References

External links
 The Fate Role-Playing Game
 Fate Core, Fate Accelerated, and System Toolkit SRD

Evil Hat Productions games
Indie role-playing games
Open-source tabletop games
Role-playing game systems
Universal role-playing games
Role-playing games introduced in 2003
FUDGE